In enzymology, a vanillin dehydrogenase is an enzyme that catalyzes the chemical reaction

 + NAD+ + H2O   + NADH +  H+

The 3 substrates of this enzyme are vanillin, NAD+, and H2O, whereas its 3 products are vanillate, NADH, and H+.

This enzyme belongs to the family of oxidoreductases, specifically those acting on the aldehyde or oxo group of donor with NAD+ or NADP+ as acceptor.  The systematic name of this enzyme class is vanillin:NAD+ oxidoreductase. This enzyme participates in 2,4-dichlorobenzoate degradation.

References 

 

EC 1.2.1
NADH-dependent enzymes
Enzymes of unknown structure